Pandit or pundit is a scholar or expert, especially of traditional Indian law, philosophy, or music.

Pandit or pundit may also refer to:
Jawaharlal Nehru, India's first and longest-serving prime minister
Pundit (explorer), a 19th-century term to denote native surveyors who explored regions to the north of India for the British Empire
Pundit (expert), an expert or opinion-leader who analyzes events in an area of expertise in the popular media
Pandit (surname)
PANDIT (database), a biological database covering protein domains

See also
Kashmiri Pandits, a Hindu population in Kashmir, India
Pandita (disambiguation)